Eastern Province is a defunct province of Afghanistan, dissolved in 1964 to create Nangarhar Province. The former province's capital was Jalalabad.

Sources
Statoids.com - Provinces of Afghanistan

History of Nangarhar Province
Former provinces of Afghanistan